The Mamiya C220 is a lightweight twin-lens reflex camera made in the early 1970s by the Japanese camera manufacturer Mamiya. The camera has interchangeable lenses ranging from 55 mm wide-angle to 250 mm telephoto and accepts 120 and 220 rollfilms. The rack and pinion focusing system with a bellows makes it possible for close-up photography without attachments. The straight film path has no sharp turns for absolute flatness of the film.

Variations of the Mamiya TLR line from the Mamiyaflex to the C330S Professional continued the evolution of the TLR camera with the final TLR, the c330S Pro.

Changeable lenses on medium format SLR and rangefinder cameras such as the Hasselblad line or Koni-Omega Press were the norm. The Mamiya twin lens reflex cameras are among the very few medium-format TLR cameras with interchangeable lenses.

 Dimensions: 118 mm (w) x 167 mm (h) x 113 mm (d)
 Weight: 1.44 kg

Lenses

There are seven Mamiya Sekor lenses:

 2 wide-angle lenses 55 mm  and 65 mm 
 2 normal lenses 80 mm  and 105 mm 
 3 telephoto lenses 135 mm , 180 mm , and 250 mm 

Every lens has its own Seikosha shutter system with a shutter speed of B, 1' -1/500 or 1/400 sec, X or M flash synchronisation and bulb mode.

Gallery of images

See also
 Mamiya C330 - uses the same lenses and other accessories
 Mamiyaflex - predecessor model

120 film cameras
Mamiya TLR cameras